This is a list of newspapers in North Dakota.  There were approximately 105 newspapers in North Dakota in 2020 according to the Library of Congress. The oldest newspaper still in print under the same name is the Hillsboro Banner, which dates from 1879.

Daily newspapers
 Bismarck Tribune - Bismarck, founded in 1873
 Devils Lake Daily Journal - Devils Lake
 The Dickinson Press - Dickinson
 The Forum of Fargo-Moorhead - Fargo and Moorhead, Minnesota
 Grand Forks Herald - Grand Forks
 Jamestown Sun - Jamestown
 Minot Daily News - Minot
 Valley City Times-Record - Valley City
 Wahpeton Daily News - Wahpeton
 Williston Herald - Williston

Weekly newspapers
 Adams County Record - Hettinger
 Aneta Star - Aneta
 Ashley Tribune - Ashley
 Benson County Farmers Press - Minnewaukan
 Beulah Beacon - Beulah
 Billings County Pioneer - Medora
 Bottineau Courant - Bottineau
 Bowman County Pioneer - Bowman
 Burke County Tribune - Bowbells
 Carson Press - Carson
 Cass County Reporter - Casselton
 Cavalier Chronicle - Cavalier
 Cavalier County Republican - Langdon
 The Center Republican - Center
 Crosby Journal - Crosby
 Dickey County Leader - Ellendale
 Dunn County Herald - Killdeer
 Edgeley Mail - Edgeley
 Edmore Herald - Edmore
 The Enderlin Independent - Enderlin
 Emmons County Record - Linton
 Glen Ullin Times - Glen Ullin
 Grant County News - Elgin
 Foster County Independent - Carrington
 Gleaner - Northwood
 Golden Valley News - Beach
 Griggs County Courier - Cooperstown
 Hatton Free Press - Hatton
 Hazen Star - Hazen
 Hebron Herald - Hebron
 The Herald-Press - Harvey
 The Herald - New England
 Hillsboro Banner - Hillsboro
 The Independent - Fingal
 The Kenmare News - Kenmare
 Kulm Messenger - Kulm
 Lake Metigoshe Mirror - Bottineau
 Lakota American - Lakota
 LaMoure Chronicle - LaMoure
 Larimore Leader-Tribune - Larimore
 The Leader-News - Washburn
 Litchville Bulletin - Litchville
 Mandan News - Mandan
 The McClusky Gazette - McClusky
 McKenzie County Farmer - Watford City
 McLean County Independent - Garrison
 McLean County Journal - Turtle Lake
 McVille Messenger - McVille
 Mountrail County Promoter - Stanley
 Mountrail County Record - Parshall
 Mouse River Journal - Towner
 Napoleon Homestead - Napoleon
 Nelson County Arena - Michigan
 New Rockford Transcript - New Rockford
 New Salem Journal - New Salem
 New Town News and Sanish Sentinel - New Town
 Oakes Times - Oakes
 Pembina New Era - Pembina
 The Pierce County Tribune - Rugby
 Ransom County Gazette - Lisbon
 Renville County Farmer - Mohall
 Richland County News-Monitor - Hankinson
 The Sargent County Teller - Milnor
 The Standard - Westhope
 Steele County Press - Finley
 Steele Ozone and Kidder County Press - Steele
 Tioga Tribune - Tioga
 Towner County Record-Herald - Cando
 Traill County Tribune - Mayville
 Tri-County News - Gackle
 Tri-County Sun - Fordville
 Turtle Mountain Star - Rolla
 Turtle Mountain Times - Belcourt
 The Underwood News - Underwood
 Valley News and Views - Drayton
 Velva Area Voice - Velva
 Walhalla Mountaineer - Walhalla
 Walsh County Press - Park River
 The Walsh County Record - Grafton
 West Fargo Pioneer - West Fargo
 Wishek Star - Wishek

Historical
 Der Staats Anzeiger
 Nonpartisan Leader

College newspapers
 The Collegian - Jamestown College
 Dakota Student - University of North Dakota
 The Hawk - Dickinson State University
 The Mystician - Bismarck State College
 Red and Green - Minot State University
 The Spectrum - North Dakota State University
 The Summit - University of Mary
 The Orbit - Mayville State University

Alternative news
 High Plains Reader - Fargo
 Great Plains Examiner - Bismarck

Circulars and trade publications
 Oil Patch Hotline - Williston
 The Williston Trader - Williston

See also

References

External links
 North Dakota Historical Society
 North Dakota Newspaper Association

 
North Dakota